Norlandair is an Icelandic airline. It was founded on 1 June 2008 when it acquired the Twin Otter flight operation of Air Iceland.

History
The company traces its roots to a company with the same name, Norlandair, that was founded in 1974. That company was founded by a few aviation professionals that acquired North Air, an aviation company based in Akureyri. In 1975 Icelandair bought a stake in the company and by that Norlandair purchased a Twin Otter aircraft that was used in scheduled flights and charter flights. This event also marks the beginning of Norlandair offering aviation services on the east coast of Greenland.

In 1997, Norlandair and the domestic flight operations of Icelandair merged and the name was changed to Air Iceland. The charter flight department and the maintenance department for the Twin Otter aircraft were located in Akureyri. In 2008 Air Iceland decided to divest the Twin Otter aircraft and the maintenance department in Akureyri. Following that decision, a few former employees of Air Iceland and investors bought the operations from Air Iceland and use the good name of Norlandair as the company was called prior to the merger with Icelandair.

Air Greenland owns 25% of Norlandair.

Destinations 
Norlandair has six scheduled destinations, Grímsey, Vopnafjörður, Þórshöfn, Gjögur, Bíldudalur and Nerlerit Inaat Airport. They operate from two bases; Akureyri Airport and Reykjavík Airport. It also operates various charter flights in Iceland and Greenland, to Svalbard and other arctic regions.

Fleet 

Norlandair's fleet consists of three de Havilland Canada DHC-6 Twin Otters aircraft, including one it purchased from Air Greenland in 2011. Additionally it operates one Beechcraft B200 King Air, and one GippsAero GA8 Airvan.

References

External links

Official website

Airlines of Iceland
Airlines established in 2008
2008 establishments in Iceland
Icelandic brands